Windrell Mansa Hayes (born December 14, 1976) is a former American football wide receiver in the National Football League. He was drafted by the New York Jets in the fifth round of the 2000 NFL Draft. He played college football at San Jose State and Southern California.

Hayes also played for the Green Bay Packers.

References

External links
New York Jets bio
USC Trojans bio

1976 births
Living people
American football wide receivers
San Jose State Spartans football players
USC Trojans football players
New York Jets players
Green Bay Packers players
Players of American football from Stockton, California